Sela is a settlement on the left bank of the Polskava River south of Ptuj in eastern Slovenia. It belongs to the Municipality of Videm and forms a more or less continuous settlement together with Barislovci. The area traditionally belonged to the Styria region. It is now included in the Drava Statistical Region.

The local church, built 1904 and dedicated to the Holy Family, although technically in Barislovci, is known locally as the church at Sela. There is also a small chapel-shrine with a belfry at the village crossroads. It was built in 1920.

References

External links
Sela on Geopedia

Populated places in the Municipality of Videm